Mohammed Safady (born 1953) is a Palestinian terrorist and one of eight Black September terrorists who perpetrated the Munich massacre, in which they invaded the Israeli quarters at the Munich Olympic Village during the 1972 Munich Olympic Games, taking hostage nine of the Israeli Olympic delegation after killing Israeli wrestling coach Moshe Weinberg and weightlifter Yossef Romano in the initial takeover.

Attack at 31 Connollystraße
In the early morning of 5 September 1972, Safady and seven other members of the Black September terrorist group broke into the Israeli delegation's headquarters at 31 Connollystraße. After they had captured the athletes in apartment number one and three, they led them under guard down the stairs to the ground floor of the building. As Israeli wrestler Gad Tsobari reached the bottom of the stairs, he pushed a hooded terrorist aside and made a dash towards the entrance to the underground car park. While Tsobari made his escape, wrestling coach Moshe Weinberg tackled Safady, landing a powerful punch on the terrorists's jaw, fracturing it and knocking out several of his teeth.  As Moshe Weinberg attempted to seize Safady's gun, which now lay on the floor, another terrorist shot Weinberg through the chest with a burst from his Kalashnikov rifle.

Fürstenfeldbruck Air Base
Safady, along with Jamal and Adnan Al-Gashey were the only three of the eight terrorists to survive the firefight with German police at Fürstenfeldbruck.

Aftermath
After their release by the German government on 29 October 1972, seven-and-a-half weeks after they were captured, Safady, along with Jamal and Adnan Al-Gashey were flown to Tripoli, where they gave a press conference to the world's media. Safady can be seen seated to the right of Jamal, who is in the centre.

Safady's fate after the Munich attack has caused much speculation. The documentary One Day in September (2000) states that he was killed by Israeli assassination squads in the aftermath of the Munich operation. However, in his book Striking Back: The 1972 Munich Olympics Massacre and Israel's Deadly Response, author Aaron J. Klein claims that during a conversation with Tawfik Tirawi in Ramallah in 2005, he was told that Safady was "alive as you are". Tirawi did not divulge any further information, only adding that "the Israelis could still harm him." Klein also claims that members of the intelligence community speculated that Safady could have been killed by Lebanese Christian Phalangists as a 'gesture' to the Israeli Mossad.

In 2022, Safady was interviewed for a German documentary film titled Tod und Spiele München 1972. During the interview, he admitted to killing the Israeli hostages, emphasizing his pride in those actions and his lack of regret or remorse for having committed them. Safady was paid US$2,000 for exclusive rights to use the clip.

See also
 Palestine Liberation Organization
 Operation Wrath of God
 List of hostage crises

References

1953 births
Living people
Members of the Black September Organization